Grünau or Grunau might refer to:

Places

Austria
Grünau im Almtal, a gemeinde in the bezirk of Gmunden, Oberösterreich
Hofstetten-Grünau, a marktgemeinde in the bezirk of Sankt Pölten-Land, Niederösterreich

Czech Republic
German name for Gruna, a village and municipality (obec) in Svitavy District, Pardubice

Germany
Grünau, Berlin, an ortsteil in the bezirk of Treptow-Köpenick, Berlin
Grünau Charterhouse, a former monastery in the regierungsbezirk of Unterfranken, Bavaria
Grünau, Leipzig, a late 20th century housing estate in Leipzig

Namibia
Grünau, Namibia, a settlement in Karas Region

Poland
German name for Stare Gronowo, a village in Człuchów County, Pomorze
German name for Siestrzechowice, a village in Nysa County, Opole
German name for Jeżów Sudecki, a village in Jelenia Góra County, Lower Silesian Voivodeship

Russia
Grünau (Grunau) - rustic village #6 of the Russian Empire (now the territory of Ukraine), founded by German colonists from Prussia in 1823-1824

People
 August Grunau (1881–1931), German politician and Unionist
 Simon Grunau, 16th-century German chronicler

See also
Schneider Grunau Baby, a German sailplane